HAT-P-16 is a F-type main-sequence star about 740 light-years away. The star has a concentration of heavy elements slightly higher than solar abundance, and low starspot activity. The survey in 2015 have failed to find any stellar companions to it.
The spectral analysis in 2014 have discovered the HAT-P-16 has a carbon to oxygen molar ratio of 0.58, close to Sun`s value of 0.55.

Planetary system
In 2010 a transiting hot superjovian planet was detected. Transit-timing variation analysis in 2016 have failed to detect an additional planets in the system.

In 2011 the observation utilizing a Rossiter–McLaughlin effect was performed, and the orbit of HAT-P-16b was found to be probably aligned with the equatorial plane of the star, misalignment angle equal to 10°.

The planet HAT-P-16b equilibrium temperature was found to be equal to 1567 K in 2013. The multiband photometry have failed to find any Rayleigh scattering in the HAT-P-16b atmosphere, which may indicate a presence of hazes or dense cloud deck.

References

Andromeda (constellation)
F-type main-sequence stars
Planetary systems with one confirmed planet
Planetary transit variables
J00381756+4227470